Amazonepeira is a genus of South American orb-weaver spiders first described by Herbert Walter Levi in 1989.

Species
 it contains five species:
Amazonepeira beno Levi, 1994 – Ecuador, Brazil, Suriname
Amazonepeira callaria (Levi, 1991) – Peru, Bolivia, Brazil
Amazonepeira herrera Levi, 1989 – Peru, Brazil
Amazonepeira manaus Levi, 1994 – Brazil
Amazonepeira masaka Levi, 1994 – Ecuador, Brazil.

References

Araneidae
Araneomorphae genera
Spiders of South America